Charles Dunbar Burgess King (12 March 1875 – 4 September 1961) was a Liberian politician who served as the 17th president of Liberia from 1920 to 1930. He was of Americo-Liberian and Sierra Leone Creole descent. He was a member of the True Whig Party, which ruled the country from 1878 until 1980.

King was Attorney General from 1904 until 1912, and Secretary of State of Liberia from 1912 until he was elected president in 1919. In this capacity, he attended the 1919 Paris Peace Conference and the accompanying First Pan-African Congress. Though a moderate supporter of reform, he continued to support the patronage machine and corrupt dominance of the True Whig Party.

President King’s administration was marked with scandal. His economic agenda and development plan constantly fell short of expectations; although literacy rates increased steadily in regards to wider access to public education he failed to prevent Liberia from political unrest further hindering economic growth.

In 1927, he won the presidential election with over 15 times more votes than there were electors, causing concern for a rigged and corrupt election, but a forced labor and slavery scandal forced his resignation in 1930. Charles King resigned in disgrace and retired from seeking higher office thereafter until his death. His presidency was marked by extreme corruption, nepotism for the hiring of officials rather than by skill, and a lack of transparency regarding the decisions his administration was making regarding the welfare of the people and utilization of slave labor.

Presidency (1920–1930)
King became Liberia's President in 1920 and served for 10 years.  Though a moderate supporter of reform, he continued to support the patronage machine and dominance of the True Whig Party. As president, he helped establish the Booker Washington Agricultural and Industrial Institute in Kakata in 1929.

Negotiation of a loan from the United States

By the early 1920s, Liberia's financial crisis had worsened to the point where President King headed up a commission that traveled to the United States to seek reorganization of the country's staggering debt burden. They arrived in March 6, 1921, shortly after President Warren G. Harding had taken office.  The U.S. Congress had suspended all foreign credit and extension of foreign loans, even though the U.S. State Department favored approving the request from the Liberian delegation. In July, U.S. Secretary of State Charles Evans Hughes said that it was the moral duty to extend the requested loan to Liberia because of an 1918 agreement between the two countries. The following month, President Harding told Congress that he agreed with Secretary Hughes. Negotiations dragged on until October before the State Department finally granted Liberia a loan for $5million (equivalent to $million in )

The United States government under President Harding proposed anew (after an attempt made during World War I from Liberian President Howard to get a loan from the previous Woodrow Wilson Administration) to Congress a $5million loan to Liberia. The House of Representatives approval the loan in a vote of 148–139, but the Senate voted 42–32 against giving the loan. This created great disappointment and a sense of desperation among Liberian officials, who worried that British and French designs on their country might now prove unstoppable.  Liberia had become a charter member of the League of Nations in 1919, and the Liberian government was determined to safeguard its sovereignty.

Firestone Rubber Company
Firestone began exporting rubber from Liberia in 1934. The Liberian economy soon came to depend on it. Firestone's subsidiary Finance Corporation of America gave a $5million loan to the Liberian government, which Liberia intended to use to consolidate and bond debts and fund public improvements. Under the terms of the loan, the President of the United States appointed a financial advisor to Liberia who had the power to approve and disapprove all expenditures by the Liberian government. The Liberian government was also required to use $2.5million of the loan to purchase bonds at a tenpercent markup. Of the remainder, over $1.1million went toward loan repayments on a 1912 loan from the U.S. As a result, very little of the proceeds of the 1934 loan were available to help the country. Meanwhile, the loan repayments constituted 40percent of the Liberian government's annual income.

Presidential election of 1927

King was challenged in the 1927 presidential election by Thomas Faulkner. According to the official statement, King received 234,000 votes; however, Liberia only had 15,000 registered voters at the time. Thus, King was later listed in the Guinness Book of Records for the most fraudulent election reported in history.

Forced labor and slavery scandal
After losing the 1927 presidential election to King, Thomas Faulkner accused many members of the True Whig Party government of recruiting and selling contract labor as slaves.  Despite Liberia's firm denials and a refusal to cooperate, the League of Nations established a commission under the leadership of British zoologist Cuthbert Christy to determine the extent of forced labor and slavery still practiced by Liberia. U.S. President Herbert Hoover briefly suspended relations to press Monrovia into compliance.

In 1930 the League of Nations published the committee's report, dubbed the ‘Christy Report’ after the Committee's chairman.  The report supported many of Faulkner's allegations and implicated many government officials, including vice president Allen Yancy.  It was found that forced labor was used for the construction of certain public works such as roads in the interior. And certain tribes did practice domestic servitude that could be considered as slavery.

The report found:
 "In order to suppress the native, prevent him from realizing his powers and limitations and prevent him from asserting himself in any way whatever, for the benefit of the dominant and colonizing race, although originally the same African stock as themselves, a policy of gross intimidation and suppression has for years been systematically fostered and encouraged, and is the key word of the Government native policy;" and
 that, "...Vice President Yancy [of Liberia] and other high officials of the Liberian Government, as well as county superintendents and district commissioners, have given their sanction for compulsory recruitment of labor for road construction, for shipment abroad and other work, by the aid and assistance of the Liberian Frontier Force; and have condoned the utilization of this force for purposes of physical compulsion on road construction for the intimidation of villagers, for the humiliation and degradation of chiefs, of captured natives to the coast, there guarding them till the time of shipment [to Fernando Po and Sao Tome.]"

Subsequently, King and Vice-President Yancy, along with other implicated leaders, resigned.

Post-presidency
King served as resident minister to the United States from 24 July 1947 to 25 July 1947, when the legation was raised to embassy. King continued to serve as ambassador until 1952.

See also
History of Liberia
1927 Liberian general election

References

External links

Google Books
Google Books

King, Charles D.B
Liberian people of Sierra Leonean descent
Sierra Leone Creole people
Liberian people of Sierra Leone Creole descent
Foreign Ministers of Liberia
King, Charles D.B.
King, Charles D.B.
True Whig Party politicians
Politicians from Monrovia
Americo-Liberian people
Attorneys general of Liberia
Ambassadors of Liberia to the United States
20th-century Liberian politicians